Oluwatoyin Victoria Adesanmi (born 10 April 1992) is a Nigerian weightlifter. She competed in the women's 63 kg event at the 2014 Commonwealth Games where she won a gold medal. She won the gold medal at the 2015 African Games.

Major results

References 

1992 births
Living people
Nigerian female weightlifters
Commonwealth Games gold medallists for Nigeria
Weightlifters at the 2014 Commonwealth Games
Commonwealth Games medallists in weightlifting
African Games gold medalists for Nigeria
African Games medalists in weightlifting
Competitors at the 2015 African Games
Yoruba sportswomen
20th-century Nigerian women
21st-century Nigerian women
Medallists at the 2014 Commonwealth Games